The Palestinian Authority Government of March 2006, also known as the  First Haniyeh Government, was a government of the Palestinian National Authority (PA), led by Ismail Haniyeh, that was sworn in on 29 March 2006 and was followed by the Palestinian unity government of 17 March 2007. On 25 January 2006, Hamas had decisively won the election for the Palestinian Legislative Council (PLC), and its leader Haniyeh formed the government, which comprised mostly Hamas members as well as four independents, after Fatah and other factions had refused to join a national unity government led by Hamas. It was the first Hamas-led PA government in the Palestinian territories.

Hamas has sworn to destroy Israel and is considered by the main donor countries to the PA to be a terrorist organization. The Quartet on the Middle East — comprising the United Nations, the United States, the European Union, and Russia — had said that its members would not deal with the Hamas government unless Hamas recognized Israel's right to exist, forswears violence and accepts the validity of previous Palestinian-Israeli agreements, including the Oslo Accords. Hamas rejected these conditions and a substantial part of the international community, especially Israel and the United States, refused to deal with the Hamas government, suspended aid to the Hamas-dominated PA government and imposed sanctions. On the swearing in of the Hamas government, Israel also withheld taxes collected on behalf of the PA, which would last for 12 months. In an attempt to deflect Israeli and international argument that the government was dominated by a terrorist organisation, in April 2006 Hamas ministers resigned membership in Hamas. To forestall a worsening humanitarian crisis and the collapse of the PA, the EU proposed the setting up of a "temporary international mechanism" (TIM) to channel international funds to the Palestinians through the Palestinian president, bypassing the Hamas-led government. TIM was accepted by the Quartet and the United States on 17 June 2006.

Following the abduction of Gilad Shalit on 25 June 2006 by Gaza-based Palestinian militants, Israel detained nearly a third of the PLC members and ministers, all officials or supporters of Hamas.

Background
Pursuant to the Oslo Accords, the authority of the PA Government is limited to some civil rights of the Palestinians in the West Bank Areas A and B and in the Gaza Strip, and to internal security in Area A and in Gaza.

Formation
The Palestinian legislative election, held on 25 January 2006, was won by Hamas. On 26 January 2006, Fatah leader Saeb Erakat said his party did not want to join a Hamas Government. The Fatah Central Committee decided that Fatah will not join the next Government, but said it would depend on President Abbas. On 28 January 2006, Hamas declared it would try to form a Government of technocrats, if a government with Fatah and all the political groups was not possible. On 29 January 2006, PLC deputies from Fatah confirmed after talks with Abbas that their faction would not join Hamas in a coalition Government and would prefer to sit in opposition, despite calls by Hamas for a “political partnership”. The decision was, however, not discussed and ratified by the Fatah Central Committee.

On 27 March 2006, Ismail Haniyeh announced formation of the new government, comprising Hamas members and four independents, to the Palestinian Legislative Council. On 28 March, the government was approved by the PLC and sworn in on 29 March 2006.

International reaction 

After the Hamas victory at the 2006 Palestinian legislative election, Israel said that if Hamas was part of the new PA government, it would restrict the movement of money, people and goods into and out of the Gaza Strip and the West Bank. The Quartet on the Middle East had said that its members would not deal with the Hamas government unless Hamas recognized Israel's right to exist, forswears violence and accepts the validity of previous Palestinian-Israeli agreements. Hamas rejected these conditions and a substantial part of the international community, especially Israel and the United States, refused to deal with the Hamas government, and imposed sanctions. 

Following the swearing in of a Hamas-led government on 29 March 2006, Israel, the United States and the Quartet imposed sanctions against the PA. On the swearing in of the Hamas government, Israel also withheld taxes collected on behalf of the PA, which would last for 12 months.

Timeline 
Due to the Israeli blockade, Ministers from West Bank and Gaza were compelled to communicate by videophone. One of the first acts of the Hamas cabinet was to freeze a round of appointments by the outgoing Fatah-led government.

A struggle for power between President Abbas and the new government emerged over the security services. Abbas made Fatah-affiliated Rashid Abu Shbak head of the three branches of the Palestinian Security Services, with authority to hire and fire officers in the three security branches, bypassing the authority of the Hamas Interior Minister. He also ordered all diplomatic statements and dealings be coordinated with the Fatah-dominated Palestine Liberation Organization, after Foreign Minister Mahmoud Zahar had sent a letter to the UN Secretary General.

In April 2006, it was announced that the Hamas Ministers in the cabinet had resigned their membership in Hamas, in an effort to reduce Israeli and international pressure, facing the economic siege. The government was followed by a unity government of March 2007.

Members of the Government 
March 2006 to March 2007

See also 
Palestinian government
Palestinian Prisoners' Document

References 

Palestinian National Authority governments
2006 establishments in the Palestinian territories
2007 disestablishments in the Palestinian territories
Cabinets established in 2006
Cabinets disestablished in 2007